The Way of a Man is a 1924 American silent Western film serial directed by George B. Seitz. Pathé Exchange also released it as a 9-reel film later in 1924. Both the serial and the film version are considered to be lost.

Plot
As described in a film magazine review, on his father's death, John Cowles goes West and meets and falls in love with Ellen Meriwether, daughter of Colonel Meriwether. Through the treachery of Gordon Orme, their convoy is nearly destroyed in an Indian attack. Later, John and his mother join the California Gold Rush. The gold camp is attacked by outlaws led by Gordon Orme, but the bandits are defeated. John wins the affections of Ellen.

Cast

Chapter titles

Into the Unknown
Redskin and White
In the Toils of the Torrent
Lost in the Wilds
White Medicine
The Firing Squad
Gold! Gold!
The Fugitive
California
Trail's End

See also
 List of film serials
 List of film serials by studio
 List of lost films

References

External links

 
 
 Poster at Getty Images
 Hough, Emerson (1907), The Way of a Man, New York: Grosset & Dunlap. (1924 photoplay edition illustrated with film stills) 

1924 films
1924 lost films
1924 Western (genre) films
American silent serial films
American black-and-white films
Lost Western (genre) films
Pathé Exchange film serials
Films directed by George B. Seitz
Lost American films
Silent American Western (genre) films
1920s American films
1920s English-language films